United Nations Security Council Resolution 122 was adopted on the 24 January 1957 and concerned the dispute between the governments of India and Pakistan over the territories of Jammu and Kashmir. It was the first of three security resolutions in 1957 (along with resolutions 123 and 126) to deal with the dispute between the countries. The resolution declares that the assembly proposed by the Jammu and Kashmir National Conference could not constitute a solution to the problem as defined in United Nations Security Council Resolution 91 which had been adopted almost six years earlier.

Resolution 122 was passed by 10 votes to none, with the Soviet Union abstaining.

See also
Kashmir conflict
List of United Nations Security Council Resolutions 101 to 200 (1953–1965)

External links 
 
Text of the Resolution at undocs.org

 0122
 0122
January 1957 events